In functional analysis, a branch of mathematics, a bounding point of a subset of a vector space is a conceptual extension of the boundary of a set.

Definition 
Let  be a subset of a vector space .  Then  is a bounding point for  if it is neither an internal point for  nor its complement.

References

Mathematical analysis
Topology